José María Gómez Sanjurjo (1930–1988) was a Paraguayan poet.

1930 births
1988 deaths
20th-century Paraguayan poets
Paraguayan male poets
20th-century male writers